Estadio Cooperativa de Ahorro y Crédito Mushuc Runa, known as Estadio COAC Mushuc Runa, is a football stadium in Ambato, Ecuador. The stadium is currently used on club level by owner Mushuc Runa, and has a capacity of 8,200 spectators.

History

After Mushuc Runa's promotion from Segunda Categoría in 2011, the club started to prepare the grounds for a new stadium in March 2012. The construction was completed in late 2018, and had its inauguration on 17 November of that year, as Mushuc Runa beat Orense 3–0 in the Serie B.

References

External links
Soccerway stadium profile

Mushuc Runa S.C.
Football venues in Ecuador
Buildings and structures in Tungurahua Province